Little Hug Fruit Barrels is a brand of fruit-flavored juice introduced in 1974. The drink is bottled in plastic 8-ounce barrel-shaped bottles and 16-ounce bottles as Big Hug.

In 2015, Royal Wessanen sold the American Beverage Corporation to Harvest Hill Beverage, owner of Juicy Juice.

History 
Little Hug Fruit Barrels were introduced in 1974 by the American Beverage Corporation.

In March 2015, the American Beverage Corporation sold the rights of the Little Hug brand to Harvest Hill Beverage Corporation for $55 million. Since their purchase of the Little Hug and Big Hug, Harvest Hill Beverage Corporation has reduced the amount of sugar in each bottle.

Little Hugs are often colloquially referred to as “quarter waters”.

Products 
 Little Hug Originals
 Little Hug Berry Blend
 Little Hug Tropical
 Little Hug Fruit Slushee
 Little Hug Lemonade Stand
 Little Hug 6-packs
 Big Hug
Flavors include lemonade, orange, fruit punch, blue raspberry, grape, kiwi-strawberry, lemonade, tropical punch, wild berry, lemon berry, and cherry berry.

Endorsements 
Little Hug has an endorsement with NASCAR driver Ricky Stenhouse Jr..

References

External links
Official website
Little Hug at American Beverage Corporation
Image of Little Hugs

Soft drinks